Gaston I (French: Gaston Ier de Béarn; died ca. 980) was an early French nobleman. He was the Viscount of Béarn.

Family 
Gaston's father was Centule II of Béarn, whilst his mother is completely unknown.

Gaston's paternal grandfather was noble Loup Centule.

At some point in his life, Gaston had married an unknown woman, and their son was Centule III of Béarn, a successor of his father and parent of Gaston II of Béarn.

Sources 

Viscounts of Béarn
Year of birth uncertain